Nello Fabbri (15 March 1934 – 30 January 2020) was an Italian professional racing cyclist. He rode in the 1959 and 1960 Tour de France.

References

External links
 

1934 births
2020 deaths
Italian male cyclists
Cyclists from Rome
20th-century Italian people